António José de Oliveira Meireles (9 April 1951 – 28 December 2021), known as Tibi, was a Portuguese footballer who played as a goalkeeper.

Club career
Born in Matosinhos, Porto District, Tibi spent the better part of his 19-year senior career with FC Porto after signing in 1982 from local club Leixões SC. After being first choice for manager Béla Guttmann, he was made surplus to requirements by José Maria Pedroto.

During his spell at the Estádio das Antas, Tibi appeared in 131 competitive matches, won two Supertaça Cândido de Oliveira and the 1977 Taça de Portugal.

International career
Tibi won two caps for Portugal over seven years. His debut was on 13 November 1974, in a 3–0 friendly away loss against Switzerland.

Death
On 28 December 2021, Tibi died in his hometown from degenerative disease. He was 70 years old.

References

External links

1951 births
2021 deaths
Sportspeople from Matosinhos
Portuguese footballers
Association football goalkeepers
Primeira Liga players
Liga Portugal 2 players
Leixões S.C. players
FC Porto players
Varzim S.C. players
F.C. Famalicão players
S.C. Espinho players
F.C. Maia players
Portugal under-21 international footballers
Portugal B international footballers
Portugal international footballers